Enon is a census-designated place (CDP) in Chesterfield County, Virginia, United States, just east of Chester. The population as of the 2010 Census was 3,466. It has the zip code 23836 and GPS coordinates 37.3504000, −77.3254000.

It is located near the intersection of East Hundred Road (State Route 10) and  I-295 just south of the Varina-Enon Bridge. It has been largely undeveloped until the development of the River's Bend Golf Course and residential development.  Recent industrial attractions include River’s Bend Business Center and the Meadowville Technology Center (which houses an Amazon.com Fulfillment Center, Virginia IT Agency, Chirisa Capital Management, Cartograf, Niagara Bottling facility, Meldine, LEGO manufacturing ,   nearby areas also are home to Altria, and AdvanSix

References

External links
 http://villagenews.us/artman/publish/article_171.shtml

Unincorporated communities in Virginia
Census-designated places in Chesterfield County, Virginia
Census-designated places in Virginia